Ubiquitin specific peptidase 22 is a protein that in humans is encoded by the USP22 gene on chromosome 17.
USP22 is known to function as a histone deubiquitinating component of the transcription regulatory histone acetylation (HAT) complex SAGA.

References

Further reading